Hong Kong competed at the 2018 Asian Games in Jakarta and Palembang, Indonesia, from 18 August to 2 September 2018. Hong Kong made its debut at the Asian Games in 1954 Manila, and the best achievement for the territory was in 2010 Asian Games held in neighboring Guangzhou, finishing with 8 gold, 15 silver and 17 bronze medals totaling 40 medals. At the previous edition in held 4 years later in Incheon, the total number of medals increased to 42, but the number of gold medals fell to 6,  In Indonesia the performance of local athletes was satisfactory, improving the results obtained in 2010 and 2014 with 46 medals (8 golds, 18 silvers and 20 bronze) achieving the best results at the games.

Medalists

The following Hong Kong competitors won medals at the Games.

|  style="text-align:left; width:78%; vertical-align:top;"|

Demonstration events

|  style="text-align:left; width:22%; vertical-align:top;"|

Competitors 
The following is a list of the number of competitors representing Hong Kong that participated at the Games:

Demonstration events

Archery 

Recurve

Artistic swimming

Athletics 

Track & road events
Men

Field events
Men

Track & road events
Women

Field events
Women

Badminton 

Hong Kong sent a full team squad to compete in all seven events.

Men

Women

Mixed

Baseball

Hong Kong participated in the baseball competition at the Games, and the team were drawn in the group B alongside Indonesia, South Korea and Chinese Taipei.

Roster
The following is the Hong Kong roster for the men's baseball tournament of the 2018 Asian Games.

Round 2 – Group B

Consolation round

Basketball 

Summary

5x5 basketball
Hong Kong men's and women's basketball team participate at the competition, drawn in group C for the men's and in group Y for the women's team.

Men's tournament

Roster
The following is the Hong Kong roster in the men's basketball tournament of the 2018 Asian Games.

Group C

Women's tournament

Roster
The following is the Hong Kong roster in the women's basketball tournament of the 2018 Asian Games.

Group Y

Bowling 

Men

Women

Canoeing

Sprint

Qualification legend: QF=Final; QS=Semifinal

Traditional boat race 

Men

Women

Canoe polo (demonstration)

Contract bridge 

Men

Women

Mixed

Cycling

Mountain biking

Road

Track

Sprint

Team sprint

 Riders who participated in the heats only and received medals.
Qualification legend: FA=Gold medal final; FB=Bronze medal final

Pursuit

 Riders who participated in the heats only and received medals.
Qualification legend: FA=Gold medal final; FB=Bronze medal final

Keirin

Qualification legend: FA=Gold medal final; FB=Bronze medal final

Omnium

Madison

Diving 

Men

Women

Equestrian 

Hong Kong was named eight athletes to compete at the Games.

Dressage

Eventing

Jumping

 – indicates that the score of this rider does not count in the team competition, since only the best three results of a team are counted.

Esports (demonstration) 

Arena of Valor and Clash Royale

Hearthstone

Pro Evolution Soccer

Fencing 

Individual

Team

Field hockey 

Hong Kong qualified a women's field hockey team after placed second at the qualifying tournament in Bangkok, Thailand. The men's team also competed at the Games after received reallocation.

Summary

Men's tournament 

Roster

Pool A

Eleventh place game

Women's tournament 

Roster

Pool A

Ninth place game

Football 

Hong Kong joined in group A at the men's football event, and the women's team competed in the group B.

Summary

Men's tournament 

Roster

Group A

Round of 16

Women's tournament 

Roster

Group B

Quarter-finals

Golf 

Hong Kong Golf Association announced their squad of seven golfers (4 men's and 3 women's) who compete in the individual and team events.

Men

Women

Gymnastics

Handball 

Hong Kong men's team were drawn in group C, while the women's team in group B.

Summary

Men's tournament

Roster

Addy Ip Kwun Ying
Leung Laam Hei
Kenny Wong Chak Kiu
Wong Shing Yip
Chan Ka Him
Tse Wing Fai
Eddy Ip Kwun Hung
Ip Shi Yan
Cheung Wai Ho
Lau Kin Pan
Wong Chun Ho
Kuo Sze Ming
Dilyadav Singh
Lin Ming Fai
Yuen Hei Yin
Tony Lee Wai Tung

Group C

Main round (Group II)

Seventh place game

Women's tournament

Roster

Chan Kam Ling
Cheung Mei Ngo
Cheung Shu Man
Wong Ching Yu
Tang Man Ting
Tsang Mei Yan
Chung Ka Yu
Leung Sin Ying
Tsang Yuen Lam
Chow Pui Yee
Wu Lei Ling
Leung Tsz Hin
Lam Sze Pui
Wong Shuk Yee
Lee Man Nga
Lam Wai Yu

Group B

5–8th place semifinal

Seventh place game

Judo 

Hong Kong put up 5 athletes for Judo:

Men

Women

Karate 

Hong Kong put-up seven karate practitioners (3 men's and 4 women's) that competed in the kata and kumite events.

Paragliding 

Men

Women

Roller sports

Skateboarding

Speed skating

Rowing 

Men

Women

Rugby sevens 

Hong Kong rugby sevens men's and women's team competed at the Games in group A respectively.

Men's tournament 

Squad
The following is the Hong Kong squad in the men's rugby sevens tournament of the 2018 Asian Games.

Head coach:  Paul John

Lee Ross Jones
Michael Richard Coverdale
Max John Woodward
Liam Thomas Herbert
James Paul Hood
Hugo Eden Stiles
Alessandro Nardoni
Max Cameron Denmark
Benjamin Reihana Rimene
Eric Kwok
Cado Lee
Salom Yiu

Group A

Quarterfinal

Semifinal

Gold medal game

Women's tournament 

Squad
The following is the Hong Kong squad in the women's rugby sevens tournament of the 2018 Asian Games.

Head coach:  Kevin John West

Stephanie Chor Ki Chan
Tsz Ching Chan
Christy Ka Chi Cheng
Chong Ka Yan
Jessica Wai On Ho
Kwong Sau Yan
Melody Blessing Nim Yan Li
Nam Ka Man
Natasha Shangwe Olson-Thorne
Poon Hoi Yan
Poon Pak Yan
Yuen Lok Yee

Group A

Quarterfinal

Classification semifinal (5–8)

Fifth place game

Sailing

Men

Women

Mixed

Shooting 

Men

Women

Mixed team

Softball 

Summary

Roster

Courtney Chan
Chan Ho Kei
Chan Yin Yu
Chen Sie Lam
Hui Kai Yan
Ku Oi Yu
Lam Pui Kwan
Lau Hiu Kwan
Lau Hiu Man
Lau Yu Yan
Leung Hiu Tung
Leung Tsz Yan
Ng Yan Wa
Pong Yui Chi
Tang Wai San
Wong Cho Hei
Marcia Ka-yan Wong

Preliminary round
The top four teams will advance to the Final round.

Sport climbing 

Speed

Speed relay

Combined

Squash 

Singles

Team

Swimming

Men

Women

Mixed

Table tennis 

Individual

Team

Taekwondo

Poomsae

Kyorugi

Tennis 

Men

Women

Mixed

Triathlon 

Individual

Mixed relay

Beach volleyball

Volleyball 

Hong Kong men's and women's indoor volleyball teams competed at the Games in group F and A respectively.

Men's tournament 

Team roster
The following is the Hong Kong roster in the men's volleyball tournament of the 2018 Asian Games.

Head coach: Yau Hok Chun

Pool F

13th–20th quarterfinal

19th place game

Women's tournament 

Team roster
The following is the Hong Kong roster in the women's volleyball tournament of the 2018 Asian Games.

Head coach: Kwok Kin Chuen

Pool A

11th place game

Water polo 

Summary

Men's tournament

Team roster
Head coach:  Zhao Jinwen

Yim Wai Ho (GK)
Wong Siu Hei (CF)
Fung Kong Chun (D)
Fung Kong Ching (CF)
Kelvin Lo (D)
Ip Chun Hong (D)
Gilman Choi (CB)
Cheng Hei Man (CB) (C)
Pin Tak Hei (D)
Cheung Tsun Yu (D)
Chan Chun Leung (CB)
Cheng Hei Chun (CF)
Kong Cheuk Kiu (GK)

Group B

Women's tournament

Team roster
Head coach:  Zhao Jinwen

Li Ho In (GK)
Chan Sze Ting (D)
So Ting Yuet (CF)
Cheng Ka Yan (D)
Ng Wai Yiu (CB)
Lau Kwan Ling (CF)
Lau Tsz Ching (D)
Yeung Sze Wai (CB) (C)
Mak Lee Sze (CF)
Lo Ka Man (D)
Zada Yeung (CB)
Gwen Leung (D)
Cindy Ho (GK)

Round robin

Wushu 

Taolu

Sanda

References 

Nations at the 2018 Asian Games
2018
Asian Games